SAP Arena is a multi-purpose arena in Mannheim, Germany. It is primarily used for ice hockey and handball, and is the home arena of the Adler Mannheim ice hockey club and the Rhein-Neckar Löwen handball club. Inaugurated in 2005, the arena has a capacity of up to 15,000 people. More than a hundred concerts and convention events are hosted at the arena annually. The SAP Arena is one of the largest in Germany and one of the most high-tech in Europe. The arena is named after its sponsor SAP.

In late December 2022, the MLP Academics Heidelberg played against FC Bayern Munich (basketball) there. The Academics drew their record crow of 10,454 visitors. For each ticket sold, a donation was made to the Courage Foundation for the support of chronically ill children.

Concerts
Tina Turner performed at the arena on 19 and 20 February 2009 during her Tina!: 50th Anniversary Tour.
Depeche Mode performed at the arena twice: On 7 November 2009 during their Tour of the Universe and on 4 February 2014 during their Delta Machine Tour, in front of a sold-out crowd of 11,280 people.
Madonna played a show in front of a sold-out crowd of 10,883 people during her Rebel Heart Tour on 29 November 2015. Deep Purple performed a show on 11 February 2013 in front of nearly 10,000 people.
Justin Timberlake played a sold-out show in front of 10,476 people during his Man Of The Woods Tour on 13 July 2018.
Celine Dion will perform at the arena during her Courage World Tour on 2 April 2024.

Services
In January 2018 the SAP Arena became the first multi-purpose arena in Germany that provides location-based services like indoor navigation and proximity marketing to its visitors. Therefore name sponsor SAP has had the arena equipped with 630 iBeacons by the German technology startup Favendo.

Transport links
A tram line (number 6) connects the SAP Arena to Mannheim city center and a newly built road connection to the B 38a highway connects it to the A 656 Autobahn, leading to the A656/A 6 interchange, connecting eastbound Mannheim to Heidelberg (A656), and north-southbound to Frankfurt, Karlsruhe and Stuttgart (A6), as well as a little north on the A6 to Kaiserlautern (westbound).

Gallery

See also
List of indoor arenas in Germany
List of European ice hockey arenas

References

External links 

 

Music venues completed in 2005
Handball venues in Germany
Indoor arenas in Germany
Indoor ice hockey venues in Germany
Basketball venues in Germany
Buildings and structures in Mannheim
Arena, SAP
Sports venues in Baden-Württemberg
Venues of the Bundesvision Song Contest
Tourist attractions in Mannheim
Sports venues completed in 2005
2005 establishments in Germany